Greenwood Christian Academy is a private Christian school with grades Preschool through high school located in Greenwood, Indiana. Currently, 775 students are enrolled at the school's two campuses.

Divisions 
Preschool: 3-year-olds and 4-year-olds
Lower School:  Kindergarten - 4th Grade
Middle School: 5th-8th Grade
High School: 9th-12th Grade

Accreditation 
GCA is fully accredited by the Indiana Department of Education (IDOE) and the Association of Christian Schools International (ACSI).

History 
In the early 1990s, a group of Greenwood-area parents approached the Community Church of Greenwood (CCG) and asked that the church consider starting a Christian school in the community. CCG's Pastor Dr. Charles Lake commissioned a team to investigate the possibility, and the team concluded that such a school would be viable but should operate independently of a single church. The team added leaders of other local churches, continued pursuing God's leading, formed Greenwood Christian Academy (GCA), and opened its doors on Madison Avenue in the fall of 1998. Two years later, GCA opened a second campus for elementary students within the CCG facility. In 2007, GCA combined its elementary and secondary schools into one building on Worthsville Road.

Facility Changes 
In April 2021, GCA announced that it would be moving its high school to the former Gathering Place facility beginning in the 2021/22 school year. Greenwood Christian Academy High School is located at 1495 West Main Street in Greenwood, and the Preschool-8th Grade campus is located at 835 West Worthsville Road in Greenwood.

Academics 
GCA's mission is "to pursue academic, spiritual, and extracurricular excellence in a Christ-centered community." Its academic philosophy encourages students to a life of engaged learning, leadership and service. Students receive individualized attention from highly qualified faculty members who are committed to encouraging and mentoring student growth. GCA's living curriculum prepares students for a successful transition into university, ministry, the military, or world of work.

Athletics 
GCA is a member of the Indiana High School Athletic Association (IHSAA) as a Class 1A school and offers volleyball, soccer, golf, cross country, basketball, cheerleading, swimming, track, softball, and baseball at the varsity level. Middle school students can participate in volleyball, soccer, cross country, basketball, cheerleading, track, softball, baseball and golf. In Fall 2022, GCA launched a varsity football program for the first time in school history.

Fine Arts 
Academic offerings in the arts include studio art, fiber art, band, chapel band, choir, drama and tech theatre. Middle school and high school students present multiple musicals and productions each year.

Alleged IHSAA violations 
In early 2021, it was reported that a parent of a member of the boys' basketball team had sent a letter to the Indiana High School Athletic Association, alleging that the coaching staff had violated the IHSAA's bylaws. No violations were reported, and GCA Athletic Director Devin Gray commented, "GCA has self-reported any and all known possible violations to the IHSAA. We are committed to excellence, integrity and transparency within our programs.”

See also
 List of high schools in Indiana

References

External links
 Official Website
 Athletics Website

Buildings and structures in Johnson County, Indiana
Christian schools in Indiana
1998 establishments in Indiana